Al Fintas is an area located in the Ahmadi Governorate, Kuwait.

Al Finţās is situated at 29.17° North latitude, 48.12° East longitude and 17 meters elevation above the sea level. 
Al Finţās is a small city in Kuwait, having about 23,071 inhabitants.

Districts of Al Ahmadi Governorate